Air Warning Squadron 4 (AWS-4) was a United States Marine Corps aviation command and control squadron during World War II. The squadron's primary mission was to provide aerial surveillance and early warning of approaching enemy aircraft during amphibious assaults.  The squadron participated in the Philippines campaign (1944–1945) in support of the Eighth Army on Mindanao.  AWS-4 was decommissioned shortly after the war in October 1945.  To date, no other Marine Corps squadron has carried the lineage and honors of AWS-4 to include Marine Air Control Squadron 4 (MACS-4).

Equipment
AN/TTQ-1 - transportable filter and operations center.
SCR-270 - long range early warning radar.
SCR-527 - medium-range early warning radar used for ground-controlled interception (GCI).
SCR-602 - Light-weight early warning radar to be utilized during the initial stages of an amphibious assault.

History

Organization and training
Air Warning Squadron 4 was commissioned on November 1, 1943, as part of Marine Air Warning Group 1 at Marine Corps Air Station Cherry Point, North Carolina.

On December 16, 1943, AWS-4 received orders to prepare to ship out to the West Coast beginning the first week of January 1944.  Arriving at Marine Corps Air Station Miramar, California on January 5, 1944, the squadron began additional training as part of Marine Air Warning Group 2.

Hawaii
The squadron embarked upon the USS Hornet (CV-12) on February 29 and departed San Diego.  Arriving at Pearl Harbor, Territory of Hawaii on March 4 it established itself at Marine Corps Air Station Ewa. The squadron's gear did not arrive until April at which point it began rigorous training in day/night fighter direction and ground controlled interception as it awaited orders to deploy. AWS-4 was the first Marine Corps squadron to receive and operate the newly fielded AN/TTQ-1 Operations Center

Los Negros and the Philippines
In November 1944, AWS-4 arrived at Los Negros in the Admiralty Islands where it established its equipment and continued training.  In February 1945 planning took place for the final portion of the Philippines Campaign.  The Marine Corps was tasked to provide four Marine Aircraft Groups and two air warning squadrons in support of the Eighth United States Army.  AWS-3 and AWS-4 were the two squadrons tapped to fulfill this mission.  It was not until April 1945 that AWS-4 departed Los Negros bound for the Southern Philippines.  The squadron landed on Mindanao and quickly established itself at Moret Field operating as the 76th Fighter Control Center.  AWS-4 was tasked with providing direction finding for lost aircraft, early warning, additional air to ground communications links and additional fighter direction nets.

Return home and decommissioning
AWS-4 departed the Philippines in early August 1945 bound for Hawaii.  Arriving at Marine Corps Air Station Ewa on August 19, the squadron began turning in all of its equipment.  Remaining personnel embarked on the USS Ticonderoga (CV-14) on September 30 for transportation back to the United States.  The squadron arrived at Naval Air Station Alameda on October 5 with follow on transportation to Marine Corps Air Station Miramar. The squadron was decommissioned on October 31, 1945, on the authority of Chief of Naval Operations Dispatch 242216, October 1945 and Marine Fleet Air, West Coast General Order #144-45.

Commanding officers
1stLt John D. Taylor - November 1, 1943 – November 11, 1943
Capt John M. Von Almen - November 12, 1943 – November 14, 1944
Capt Charles T. Porter November 15, 1944 – August 14, 1945
Capt John C. Adams - August 15, 1945 – August 20, 1945
Maj Freeman R. Cass. - August 21, 1945 – October 26, 1945
WO R.E. Lesher - October 27, 1945 – October 31, 1945

Unit awards
A unit citation or commendation is an award bestowed upon an organization for the action cited. Members of the unit who participated in said actions are allowed to wear on their uniforms the awarded unit citation. What follows is an incomplete list of the awards AWS-4 has been presented with:

See also
 Aviation combat element
 United States Marine Corps Aviation
 List of United States Marine Corps aviation support units

Citations

References

Bibliography

 
Web

Radar
Inactive units of the United States Marine Corps
Military units and formations established in 1943
1943 establishments in North Carolina